This is a list of Sahitya Akademi Award winners for works in Sindhi language.

The Sahitya Akademi Award is an annual award given by the Sahitya Akademi (India's National Academy of Letters), to writers in 24 Indian languages. The award was instituted and first awarded in 1955. It carries a monetary reward, of 100,000 Rupees since 2009, and a citation. The list of Sindhi language writers who have won the award is given below.

Winners

References

Sindhi
Sahitya Akademi Award
Sahitya Akademi Award